Shane Pinto (born November 12, 2000) is an American professional ice hockey center for the Ottawa Senators of the National Hockey League (NHL). He was drafted 32nd overall by the Senators, the first pick in the second round of the 2019 NHL Entry Draft.

Early life
Pinto was born on November 12, 2000, in Franklin Square, New York, U.S. to parents Frank and Catherine. He was born into an athletic family as his father played baseball growing up while his mother and sister played softball. His older sister Brianna captained the Fordham University women's softball team as an undergraduate and continued playing while completing her master's degree.

Though a native New Yorker, Pinto grew up a Pittsburgh Penguins fan.

Playing career

Amateur
Growing up in New York, Pinto played baseball and American football before beginning organized ice hockey at the age of seven. Upon beginning skating, Pinto spent nearly his entire minor hockey career with the Tier 2 Brooklyn Aviators. At the age of 12, he helped lead the Aviators to a state championship and then played a year above his age group before suffering a collarbone injury. Pinto originally desired to pursue a professional career in baseball before beginning his prep school career at the age of 15. After a productive 16U season with the Aviators, Pinto described his 2017, 2018, and 2019 seasons as the most important to his development. After the 2016–17 season, Pinto was drafted in the 21st round, 330th overall, by the  Lincoln Stars of the United States Hockey League (USHL). He then joined the USHL for the 2018-2019 regular season where he quickly began producing for the Stars. Through his first 30 games in the league, Pinto tallied 17 goals and 15 assists for 32 points while also leading all rookies with 6 power-play goals. In January 2019, Pinto was traded to the Tri-City Storm in exchange for Michael Colella, a 2019 3rd Round Phase II draft pick, a 2020 2nd Round Phase II draft pick, and future considerations. Pinto was named to the USHL all-rookie team in 2019 after leading all first-year players with 59 points in 59 games.

Collegiate
Pinto committed to playing the 2019–20 season with the North Dakota Fighting Hawks and was considered the top recruit for that year's incoming freshman class.

During his first development camp with the Ottawa Senators, Pinto impressed scouts with his play, and after completing his sophomore season with the Fighting Hawks, Pinto concluded his collegiate career by signing a three-year, entry-level contract with the Ottawa Senators on April 1, 2021.

Career
After undergoing the mandatory quarantining period, Pinto made his NHL debut late in the 2020–21 season and scored his first goal on May 5, 2021, against the Montreal Canadiens. He finished the season tallying one goal and six assists. Pinto later participated in rookie camp a few months later in September, where he was appointed team captain for one game.

Pinto missed nearly the entire 2021–22 season due to injuries. During his fourth game of the year, he was hit into the boards by Mario Ferraro and left with a shoulder injury. He attempted to return nine games later against the Pittsburgh Penguins but reinjured the same shoulder while taking a faceoff. He ended up having surgery and missed the rest of the year.

Pinto recovered on time to start the 2022–23 season and got off to a hot start. In October he was named the NHL's rookie of the month after scoring six goals in eight games.

International play
Pinto was named to the United States men's national junior ice hockey team for the 2020 World Junior Ice Hockey Championships. Pinto enjoyed early success for the team, being named the player of the game for the opening game of the tournament against Canada men's national junior ice hockey team after scoring two goals and netting an assist.

Career statistics

Regular season and playoffs

International

Awards and honors

References

External links
 

2000 births
Living people
American men's ice hockey centers
Lincoln Stars players
North Dakota Fighting Hawks men's ice hockey players
Ottawa Senators draft picks
Ottawa Senators players
Tri-City Storm players
AHCA Division I men's ice hockey All-Americans